Shubham Singh (born 5 January 1997) is an Indian cricketer. He made his first-class debut for Chhattisgarh in the 2017–18 Ranji Trophy on 14 October 2017. He made his Twenty20 debut for Chhattisgarhin the 2018–19 Syed Mushtaq Ali Trophy on 25 February 2019.

References

External links
 

1997 births
Living people
Indian cricketers
Place of birth missing (living people)
Chhattisgarh cricketers